Ahmet Reşat Arığ (born 5 August 1964) is a Turkish volleyball coach.

External links
 Coach profile at WorldofVolley.com 
 Coach profile at Volleybox.net

1964 births
Living people
People from Elazığ
Turkish volleyball coaches
Galatasaray S.K. (women's volleyball) coaches
Galatasaray S.K. (men's volleyball) coaches